In a Warzone is the third album by the American punk rock/hip hop band Transplants. It was premiered as a stream on Rolling Stone's website on June 17, 2013 and released via Epitaph Records on June 25, 2013. Recording sessions took place at Opra Music Studios and The Boat in Los Angeles. Audio production of the record was entirely handled by the Transplants with Christopher Holmes. Rancid's Matt Freeman, Left Alone's Elvis Cortez, UGK's Bun B, Bored Stiff's Equipto, and Expensive Taste's Paul Wall made their appearances on the album as additional musicians and vocalists. The band supported the album by touring with Rancid.

The album peaked at #58 on the Billboard 200 in the United States. Its lead single "Come Around" did not appear on any major chart.

Track listing

Personnel
 Tim Armstrong – vocals, guitar
 Rob "Skinhead Rob" Aston – vocals, photography, design & layout
 Travis Barker – drums
 Kevin Bivona – acoustic guitar, bass, keyboards, engineering
 Elvis Cortez – guitar
 Bernard Freeman – vocals (track 5)
 Ilych Sato – vocals (track 5)
 Paul Slayton – vocals (track 9)
 Matt Freeman – bass (track 9)
 Christopher Holmes – additional producer, engineering, mixing
 James M. Ingram – engineering
 Brian Gardner – mastering
 Estevan Oriol – photography
 Usugrow – artwork
 Mark Machado – artwork
 Nick Pritchard – design & layout
 Kevin Wolff – management
 Lawrence Vavra – management

Charts

References

External links 

2013 albums
Epitaph Records albums
Transplants (band) albums